Harry Toft (second ¼ 1881 – fourth ¼ 1951), also known by the nickname of "The Human Corkscrew", was a Welsh rugby union, and professional rugby league footballer who played in the 1900s and 1910s. He played representative level rugby union (RU) for Glamorgan County RFC, and at club level for Swansea RFC, as a centre, or fly-half, and club level rugby league (RL) for Hunslet.

Background
Harry Toft's birth was registered in Swansea district, Glamorgan, and his death aged 77 was registered in Leeds district, West Riding of Yorkshire, England.

Playing career

Notable county matches
Harry Toft played alongside fellow Swansea RFC players; George Hayward, Phil Hopkins, Fred Lewis, Ivor Morgan and Dicky Owen (captain) in Glamorgan County RFC's 3–16 defeat by Australia at Cardiff Arms Park on Wednesday 7 October 1908.

Notable tour matches
Harry Toft played in Swansea RFC's 6–0 victory over Australia at St. Helen's Rugby and Cricket Ground, Swansea on Saturday 26 December 1908 in front of a crowd of 40,000.

Genealogical information
Harry Toft's marriage to Florence Catherine (née Westwood) (birth registered during third ¼ 1882 in Aston district – death registered during fourth ¼ 1940 (aged 58) in Leeds district) was registered during fourth ¼ 1905 in Swansea district. They had four children; Irene, Olive, Harry and Beryl Toft (birth registered during first ¼ 1915 in Hunslet district – death registered during second ¼ 1933 (aged 18) in North Leeds district).

References

External links
Search for "Toft" at rugbyleagueproject.org
Statistics at swansearfc.co.uk
The Story Of Swansea RFC In The 1906-07 Season
George Hayward's profile at swansearfc.co.uk
Ex-Swansea Player. Harry Toft Talks About N.U. Football

1881 births
1951 deaths
Hunslet F.C. (1883) players
Rugby league centres
Rugby league players from Swansea
Rugby union centres
Rugby union fly-halves
Rugby union players from Swansea
Swansea RFC players
Welsh rugby league players
Welsh rugby union players